HCS Coote was a sloop-of-war that served the British East India Company (EIC) during the 19th century. The Bombay Dockyard launched Coote in 1827. Though the EIC built Coote, her size and armament were equivalent to the retired Cruizer-class brig-sloops.

Fate
Coote was lost on 1 December 1845. She had left Bombay on 22 November, and wrecked at Calicut, on the Malabar Coast, on what became known as Coote Reef. Her officers and crew abandoned her as unsalvageable on 3 December. Her captain, Lieutenant J.S. Grieve, his officers, and crew all survived. All her guns, and a great deal of her stores and ammunition were saved. The EIC was able, eventually, to get her off the rocks. The company decided to sell the hull at Calicut rather than attempt to tow it to Bombay. A Calicut resident bought the hull for 10,000 rupees, but as she was being towed on shore where her leaks might be repaired, she sank into mud and appeared a total loss.

Notes, citations, and references
Notes

Citations

References
 

 
  
 

 

Ships of the Bombay Marine
Ships of the East India Company's Indian Navy
1827 ships
Maritime incidents in December 1845